The men's 10,000 metres event at the 2002 African Championships in Athletics was held in Radès, Tunisia on August 7.

Results

References

2002 African Championships in Athletics
10,000 metres at the African Championships in Athletics